Henllys means 'ancient court' with hen 'ancient' and llys 'court'. The name may refer to the former administrative court of the lordship of Machen  Today Henllys is a residential area and community on the edge of Cwmbrân in South East Wales,  with a population of 2,682 as of the 2011 census.

See also

Cwmbran
Torfaen County Borough Council
Grade II* listed buildings in Torfaen
Scheduled Monuments in Torfaen
Communities of Torfaen

References

Communities in Torfaen
Villages in Torfaen
Suburbs of Cwmbran